The 1998 TCU Horned Frogs football team represented Texas Christian University (TCU) in the 1998 NCAA Division I-A football season. The Horned Frogs finished the season 7–5 overall and 4–4 in the Western Athletic Conference. The team was coached by Dennis Franchione. The Frogs played their home games in Amon G. Carter Stadium, which is located on campus in Fort Worth, Texas.

Schedule

References

TCU
TCU Horned Frogs football seasons
Sun Bowl champion seasons
TCU Horned Frogs football